Richard Lloyd may refer to:

Politicians
 Richard Lloyd (by 1531–70), MP
 Richard Lloyd (MP for Flint Boroughs), in 1584, MP for Flint Boroughs (UK Parliament constituency)
 Sir Richard Lloyd (Royalist) (1606–1676), Member of Parliament (MP) for Cardiff and Radnorshire
 Sir Richard Lloyd (Durham politician) (1634–1686), MP for and Chancellor of Durham
 Richard Lloyd (died 1714) (c.1661–1714), MP for New Shoreham
 Sir Richard Lloyd (died 1761) (1696–1761), MP for Mitchell and Totnes, Solicitor General for England and Wales
 Richard Eyre Lloyd (1906–1991), British Army officer
 Richard John Lloyd (1846–1906), British linguist and phoneticist
 Richard Savage Lloyd (1730–1810), English MP
 Richard Lloyd (Cardigan politician) (c.1703–1757), MP for Cardigan

Others
 Sir Richard Lloyd, 2nd Baronet (1928–2022)
 Richard Lloyd (guitarist) (born 1951), American guitarist from the band Television
 Richard Lloyd (racing driver) (1945–2008), British racing driver and team owner
 Richard Lloyd Racing, formerly known as GTi Engineering, British motor racing team founded by Richard Lloyd
 Rick Lloyd, British actor and musical director
 Dickie Lloyd (1891–1950), cricketer and rugby union player
 Iloosh Khoshabe, aka Richard Lloyd (1932-2012), Iranian bodybuilder and actor
 Richard Hey Lloyd (1933–2021), British organist and composer